Sir Anthony Musgrave  (31 August 1828 – 9 October 1888) was a colonial administrator and governor.  He died in office as Governor of Queensland in 1888.

Early life
He was born at St John's, Antigua, the third of 11 children of Anthony Musgrave and Mary Harris Sheriff.

After education in Antigua and Great Britain, he was appointed private secretary to Robert James Mackintosh, governor-in-chief of the Leeward Islands in 1854. He was recognised for his "capacity and zeal", and quickly promoted, administering in turn the British West Indies territories of Nevis and St. Vincent and the Grenadines.

Musgrave was born to a slaveholding family. His father and uncles, were slaveholders who were compensated for their slaves upon the emancipation of slavery in the 1830s.

British North America
After ten years of colonial service in the Caribbean, Musgrave was appointed governor of Newfoundland in September, 1864.  Unlike his previous appointments, Newfoundland had responsible government and an active colonial assembly.  He also found a colony in dire economic straits, containing a destitute population.  During his tenure, Musgrave dedicated most of energies towards convincing Newfoundland to remedy this by joining the negotiations with other British North American colonies towards union in what would become the Canadian Confederation.  In this project, he was allied with the goals of the colonial office.  Despite his efforts, and what seemed like imminent success, Musgrave ultimately failed to move the colonial assembly to accepting terms of union.  Canada was proclaimed on 1 July 1867—and Newfoundland would not join Confederation for eighty two years.

In consultation with the colonial office and the Canadian Prime Minister, John A. Macdonald, it was agreed that Musgrave should redirect his energies concerning the expansion of the Canadian confederation away from the easternmost colony of British North America, to the westernmost—the United Colonies of Vancouver Island and British Columbia.  Following the death of Frederick Seymour, Musgrave took up his new responsibilities as colonial governor in August, 1869.  Musgrave found a colony in an administrative and financial mess, with a fractious assembly, long-simmering disputes between the two colonies and their capitals – Victoria and New Westminster—and general frustration with the slow pace of negotiations for the colony to enter confederation.  Musgrave proved to be both a capable administrator, and an able placater of the assembly's notoriously contentious members.  In less than two years, in July, 1871, British Columbia joined Canada as its sixth province.

Natal
Musgrave did a brief stint as governor of the South African colony of Natal.

South Australia

Musgrave's next posting was to South Australia. This proved to be a substantially less taxing appointment. During his tenure, Musgrave supported the assembly in its plans to borrow a large sum for the purpose of extensive railway construction, the imposition of additional taxation, and the introduction of a considerable number of immigrants into what was still a largely unsettled hinterland.

Jamaica
After three and a half years in the antipodes, Musgrave returned to the Caribbean as governor of Jamaica. He would govern the colony for the next six years, focusing much of his attention on improving its cultural life. Under his administration, the government purchased Jamaica Railway Company and extended the line. Musgrave also initiated the Jamaica Scholarship, and was instrumental in establishing the Institute of Jamaica, dedicated to fostering and encouraging the development of arts, science, and literature. The Musgrave Medal, awarded by the institute for excellence in these fields, was named in his honour in 1897.

Queensland

Musgrave's last appointment was back in Australia, as governor of the colony of Queensland, where he arrived on 7 November 1883 in the Ranelagh. Like South Australia, Queensland enjoyed full responsible government, and Musgrave was more of a spectator of the political scene. He travelled with premier Samuel Griffith to visit the northern parts of the colony including Cooktown, Port Douglas, Cairns, Townsville, Charters Towers, Mourilyan Harbour, Cardwell, and Bowen. During this period, he was faced with responding to the action of the colony's premier, Sir Thomas McIlwraith, in "annexing" New Guinea as part of Queensland – an action repudiated by the colonial office.

Governor Anthony Musgrave was at the point of retiring from the colonial service when he died at his desk in Brisbane on 9 October 1888 from strangulation of the bowel. His funeral was held on 10 October 1888 at St John's Cathedral, after which he was interred in Brisbane's Toowong General Cemetery on the principal slope near to the grave of Governor Blackall, the location being personally selected by premier Thomas McIlwraith.

In May 1939, his grave was reported as unkempt and overgrown with weeds.

Family
He married in 1854 to Christiana Elizabeth, daughter of the Hon. Sir William Byam of Antigua (she died in 1859). During his tenure in British Columbia, Musgrave married his second wife, Jeanie Lucinda Field who was the daughter of David Dudley Field. Their daughter, Joyce, died in South Australia during 1874.
According to article in "Air Clues" May 1995, he also had three sons: Arthur David Musgrave b.1874 d.1931 (Served in the Army, ending the war as CRA 52nd Division, retiring as a Brigadier General), Herbert Musgrave DSO RFC and RE, b.11 May 1876 in Adelaide, S.Australia, d.2 June 1918 in German territory and Dudley Field Musgrave b.1873 d.1895 of Typhoid Fever in Bombay (Served in the Royal Navy reaching Lieutenant).

According to www.biographi.ca Sir.Anthony was 3rd of 11 children.

Places named for Musgrave

Australia
Queensland
 Port Musgrave, an embayment located on the northwestern tip of the Cape York Peninsula.
Musgrave, a locality in east-central Queensland
Musgrave Hill, a locality in Southport, Gold Coast
Musgrave Road in Brisbane (from Petrie Terrace through Red Hill)
The Queensland Government's steam yacht of 1884 was named Lucinda after Lady Musgrave
Lucinda, Queensland, is a small town, now bustling sugar terminal, near Ingham, Queensland
Lady Musgrave Island, an island located near the southern end of the Great Barrier Reef
Lady Musgrave Drive in Mountain Creek, Queensland

South Australia
The Musgrave Ranges, a mountain range located at the extreme northwestern part of South Australia.
Lucindale, a town named after Lady Musgrave in 1877

British Columbia
Musgrave Landing is a locality on the southwest coast of Saltspring Island in the Gulf Islands of southwestern British Columbia.
The Musgrave Peaks (or Musgrave Range) is a part of the Coast Mountains, located in the Estevan Islands off the north-central coast of British Columbia. Musgrave also helped in the making of British Columbia by assisting in the negotiation in Ottawa.

Jamaica
Lady Musgrave Road is a thoroughfare in Kingston, Jamaica named for his wife.
Musgrave Market is a market in Port Antonio, Portland, Jamaica.

Newfoundland
The town of Muddy Hole was renamed Musgrave Harbour in 1886.  It is located on central Newfoundland's Kittiwake Coast.
Musgravetown was founded in 1863, and is located on Bonavista Bay in eastern Newfoundland.
Mount Musgrave is a 540 m peak of the Long Range Mountains of western Newfoundland.

South Africa
The major street Musgrave Road in Durban, KwaZulu-Natal, is named after Musgrave. It is the location of the Musgrave Centre mall, named after the road, rather than the former Lieutenant-Governor.

See also
Arthurton, South Australia

Notes

References

External links

Biography at Government House The Governorship of Newfoundland and Labrador
The Contribution of Sir Anthony Musgrave from the website of the Jamaican Family Search Genealogy Research Library
Musgrave, Sir Anthony — Brisbane City Council Grave Location Search
Guide to the Sir Anthony Musgrave Papers, 1739–1966 — Archive of the personal papers of Musgrave, his wife Jeanie Lucinda, and her father David, at Duke University Libraries

1828 births
1888 deaths
People from St. John's, Antigua and Barbuda
Antigua and Barbuda people of British descent
Governors of South Australia
Governors of the Colony of South Australia
Governors of Queensland
Lieutenant Governors of British Columbia
Governors of Newfoundland Colony
Governors of Jamaica
Colonial governors of British Columbia and Vancouver Island
Knights Grand Cross of the Order of St Michael and St George
Persons of National Historic Significance (Canada)
Burials at Toowong Cemetery
Governors of British Saint Vincent and the Grenadines
Colony of British Columbia (1866–1871) people
Governors of Natal
British colonial governors and administrators in Oceania